Jennifer Alleyn (born 1969) is a Canadian artist, filmmaker, writer and photographer who lives and works in Montreal.

Biography
The daughter of artist Edmund Alleyn, she was born in Switzerland. She studied film at Concordia University. Alleyn worked as a journalist for the newspapers Le Devoir, Montreal Gazette and La Presse and for Elle Québec magazine. She travelled around the world while participating in the Radio-Canada television program .

Alleyn wrote and directed a segment "Aurore et Crépuscule" of the 1996 film Cosmos; Cosmos was included in the Directors' Fortnight at Cannes. Her 2003 film Svanok was awarded the prize for best short fiction film by the Association québécoise des critiques de cinéma. 

She directed the 2010 film Dix fois Dix about painter Otto Dix, which received the Prix Tremplin pour le monde ARTV.

In 2018, she directed and produced Impetus, a hybrid drama feature described by Denis Villeneuve as " Playful like a Godard or Varda film. Brilliant and moving". The film premiered at Slamdance, Utah and Torino, Italy. Alleyn was awarded the 2019 PRIX CREATION, by the Observatoire du Cinéma au Québec for "her outstanding contribution to Quebec cinema".

References

External links 
 Jenniferalleyn.com
 

1969 births
Living people
Artists from Montreal
Canadian women photographers
Canadian women screenwriters
Film directors from Montreal
Canadian women film directors
Journalists from Montreal
Writers from Montreal
Concordia University alumni
Canadian women non-fiction writers
21st-century Canadian photographers
21st-century Canadian women artists
21st-century women photographers